Bandh Reshmache is a Marathi Indian soap opera created and produced by Ekta Kapoor under her banner Balaji Telefilms. The series premiered on 21 February 2011 and aired on Star Pravah.

Plot
The series portrays the adoring love story of Nandini Bramhapurikar (Suparna Kharde) and Shekharraj Daulatrao (Akshar Kothari) whereby the protagonists hate each other but as destiny has something in store for them their story that starts from hatred turns into undying love for each other. The series is set in the interiors of Maharashtra explores the tale of intrigue, romance, and a social tug-of-war.

Cast
 Suparna Kharde as Nandini Bramhapurikar
 Akshar Kothari as Shekharraj Daulatrao
 Prajakta Mali as Aditti
 Suyash Tilak as Aditya Brahmapurikar
 Reshma Shinde

Reception 
In week 24 of 2011, it garnered 2.0 TVR maintaining top position at its slot.

References

Balaji Telefilms television series
2011 Indian television series debuts
2012 Indian television series endings
Marathi-language television shows
Star Pravah original programming